Garry Young ( January 2, 1936 – September 13, 1994) was a professional ice hockey coach and executive. He was head coach and general manager for the California Golden Seals and head coach for the St. Louis Blues in the National Hockey League.

Hockey career
He began his career as a scout for the Boston Bruins, and was promoted to chief scout and director of player personnel. In 1971, Young was hired by Charlie Finley as the California Golden Seals' new General Manager, replacing interim Fred Glover. He named himself coach after he dismissed Vic Stasiuk in the 1972 off-season. He was fired 12 games into the 1972–73 NHL season in light of irregularities surrounding Dick Redmond's contract. He created several copies of the contract with different amounts of compensation for Redmond's services on each. Finley rectified the situation by having Redmond traded to the Chicago Black Hawks and firing Young. Fred Glover was named Young's replacement.

Young was hired by the NHL brass as General Manager of the Golden Seals again in February 1974 after Glover resigned. Young's term was again short-lived: he resigned prior to the beginning of the following season. He joined the St. Louis Blues as their head coach later that year, lasting there for parts of two seasons.

He later coached the Peterborough Petes for a single season.

Personal information
Young had four children with his first wife Verna; Steven, Michael, Linda and Paul. And two children with his second wife Susan; Scott and Elaine. Young drowned in a boating accident in 1994. He is buried in Orono, Ontario. Young's grandfather was Weldy Young, an early ice hockey player with the Ottawa Hockey Club in the 1890s.

Coaching record

References

Diamond, D., Dinger, R., Duplacey, J., Fitzsimmons, E., Kuperman, I., Meagher, G., Pasternak, J., & Zweig, E. (Eds.) (1998). Total Hockey. New York City: Total Sports. 
Kurtzberg, B. (2006). Shorthanded: The Untold Stories of the Seals, Hockey's Most Colorful Team. Bloomington, IN: AuthorHouse. 
http://nl.newsbank.com/nl-search/we/Archives?p_product=SL&p_theme=sl&p_action=search&p_maxdocs=200&p_topdoc=1&p_text_direct-0=0F482480DF26CED6&p_field_direct-0=document_id&p_perpage=10&p_sort=YMD_date:D&s_trackval=GooglePM

External links

1936 births
1994 deaths
Boston Bruins scouts
California Golden Seals executives
California Golden Seals coaches
St. Louis Blues coaches
Ice hockey people from Toronto